Peebles is a town in Scotland.

Peebles may also refer to:

 Peebles (surname)
 Peebles (store), a defunct department store chain in the eastern United States
 Peebles, Ohio
 Peebles, Saskatchewan, an organized hamlet in Canada
 Peebles, Wisconsin, an unincorporated community
 Peebles' Corner Historic District, Cincinnati, Ohio
 SS Peebles or SS Gracechurch, a cargo steamship built in 1930 and torpedoed in 1940
 SS Peebles (1911), a shipwreck in October 1917
 Peebles, New Zealand, a place in North Otago
 Peebles Hospital, the main public hospital in the British Virgin Islands
 Peebles House, listed on the National Register of Historic Places in North Carolina

See also
Pebbles (disambiguation)